Harald Bothner (30 November 1850 – 24 October 1924) was a Norwegian politician for the Liberal Party, born in Halden. He was a district stipendiary magistrate by profession. From 1878 to 1880 he worked as a solicitor in Sarpsborg, before moving to Halden. Bothner became a District Attorney in Stavanger in 1889, and a judge in Stjør- og Verdal district court in 1896. He entered into national politics in 1903, when he was elected a member of the Norwegian parliament for northern Trondheim for the period 1903–06. Bothner was appointed member of the Council of State Division in Stockholm in 1905, and served as Minister of Auditing later the same year. On 27 November 1905 he was made Minister of Justice in the coalition government of Christian Michelsen, a position he held until the cabinet's dissolution in 1907. After retiring from the government he was County Governor of Sør-Trøndelag until 1921.

References

Further reading

Government ministers of Norway
1850 births
1924 deaths
Ministers of Justice of Norway
People from Halden